Omuramba (plural: Omiramba) is the term for ancient river-beds found in the Kalahari Desert of Africa, notably in the North Eastern part of Namibia and North Western part of Botswana. The word is taken from the Herero language. An omuramba provides occasional standing pools of water and more fertility than in the surrounding sand plains. Some specific omiramba are named: Eiseb, Rietfontein, Epukiro, Omatako. They mostly start in the central parts of Namibia and run into the central parts of Botswana.

The depth and width of the beds varies, with some being 3 to 4 km wide. Omiramba that were perennial rivers about 16.000 years ago now flow only for short distances, and only after heavy rains. Herdsmen love to make their cattle posts in or near omiramba, so they do not need to use their pumping equipment to extract subterranean water, which may be as deep as 300 m.

Historically, they are known for battles which were fought along their winding courses, notably the Herero-German war in 1904, which ended in a terrible genocide that killed nearly 70 percent of the Herero population and saw many others flee down the omiramba, which were then in the dry season and inhospitable. The omiramba were also home to Bushmen people in pre-colonial times. 

Geography of Namibia
Geography of Botswana
Kalahari Desert
Former rivers